The Destroyer is an album by electronic artist Alec Empire, his first on his own record label Digital Hardcore Recordings, released in 1996 in Europe and a revised version in 1998 in United States. Destroyer is also the name given to a series of EPs by Empire released two years before. Unlike his previous albums for Mille Plateaux, The Destroyer had a much heavier sound more akin to that of his band Atari Teenage Riot, and is considered one of the earliest examples of a breakcore record. Producer Enduser named the album as an inspiration for his music. The album peaked at #54 on the CMJ Radio Top 200 in the U.S.

Track listing

References

External links
The Destroyer CD at Discogs
The Destroyer LP at Discogs
The Destroyer on Bandcamp
Official Digital Hardcore Recordings site

1996 albums
Alec Empire albums